This article is about the particular significance of the year 1716 to Wales and its people.

Incumbents
Lord Lieutenant of North Wales (Lord Lieutenant of Anglesey, Caernarvonshire, Denbighshire, Flintshire, Merionethshire, Montgomeryshire) – Hugh Cholmondeley, 1st Earl of Cholmondeley 
Lord Lieutenant of Glamorgan – vacant
Lord Lieutenant of Brecknockshire and Lord Lieutenant of Monmouthshire – John Morgan (of Rhiwpera)
Lord Lieutenant of Cardiganshire – John Vaughan, 1st Viscount Lisburne
Lord Lieutenant of Carmarthenshire – vacant
Lord Lieutenant of Pembrokeshire – Sir Arthur Owen, 3rd Baronet
Lord Lieutenant of Radnorshire – Thomas Coningsby, 1st Earl Coningsby

Bishop of Bangor – John Evans (until January) Benjamin Hoadly (from 18 March)
Bishop of Llandaff – John Tyler
Bishop of St Asaph – John Wynne
Bishop of St Davids – Adam Ottley

Events
January John Evans, Bishop of Bangor, is translated to Meath in Ireland, leaving Wales without any Welsh-speaking bishops for a prolonged period.
27 July Griffith Jones becomes rector of Llanddowror, under the patronage of his brother-in-law Sir John Philipps, 4th Baronet.
9 November – In London, Caroline of Ansbach, Princess of Wales, gives birth to a stillborn son, Prince Augustus George of Wales.

Arts and literature

New books
Myles Davies - Athenae Britannicae (six vols., London)
Welsh translation of works by Tertullian and Cyprian, probably by John Morgan of Matchin

Births
date unknown - Henry Owen, theologian (died 1795)
probable - Howel Davies, Methodist clergyman (died 1770)

Deaths
26 January - Daniel Williams, theologian, 72?
8 May - Thomas Allgood I, originator of the japanning industry at Pontypool and Usk
29 June - Richard Lucas, clergyman and writer, 65
29 September - David Edwards, Independent minister, 56 
date unknown - Howell Powell, Congregational minister

See also
1716 in Scotland

References

1710s in Wales
Years of the 18th century in Wales